Macovei is a surname. Notable people with the surname include:

Andrei Macovei, Moldovan chess master
Bogdan Macovei (disambiguation)
Bogdan Macovei (handball coach), a Romanian handball coach
Bogdan Macovei (luger), a Romanian-born Moldovan luger
Florin Macovei, football player
Gheorghe Macovei
Ion Macovei, engineer
Monica Macovei, Member of the European Parliament
Toma Macovei, Interlingua scholar

See also 
 Macov
 Macoviște (disambiguation)

Romanian-language surnames